The 2022 Pinty's Truck Race on Dirt was the sixth stock car race of the 2022 NASCAR Camping World Truck Series and the second iteration of the event. The race was held on Saturday, April 16, 2022, at a dirt version of Bristol Motor Speedway in Bristol, Tennessee, a  permanent oval-shaped short track. The race was contested over 150 laps. Ben Rhodes of ThorSport Racing would win the race, after passing Carson Hocevar for the lead with 4 laps to go. He would also win both stages, and lead 95 laps. This was Rhodes' sixth career truck series win, and his first of the season. To fill out the podium, Carson Hocevar of Niece Motorsports and John Hunter Nemechek of Kyle Busch Motorsports would finish 2nd and 3rd, respectively.

This was the debut race for 2021 USAC National Midget Series champion, Buddy Kofoid.

Background 
Bristol Motor Speedway, formerly known as Bristol International Raceway and Bristol Raceway, is a NASCAR short track venue located in Bristol, Tennessee. Constructed in 1960, it held its first NASCAR race on July 30, 1961. Despite its short length, Bristol is among the most popular tracks on the NASCAR schedule because of its distinct features, which include extraordinarily steep banking, an all concrete surface, two pit roads, and stadium-like seating.

In 2021, the race shifted to a dirt surface version of the track and was renamed the Pinty's Truck Race on Dirt. On January 25, 2021, NASCAR announced the stage lengths of all events in all three series. According to the stage lengths, it states the race will consist of 150 laps.

Entry list 

 (R) denotes rookie driver.
 (i) denotes driver who is ineligible for series driver points.

*Originally, Gordon was slated to run the #46 car under the G2G Racing name. However, the team had bought a chassis from CMI Motorsports, which was not then not transferred to be registered for the G2G Racing team. Facing withdrawal, G2G Racing owner Tim Viens begged CMI Motorsports owner, Ray Ciccarelli, to be able to use the CMI Motorsports name, as the team had withdrawn from all NASCAR racing and had only been scheduled to do local dirt track racing.

Practice

First practice 
The first 50-minute practice session was held on Friday, April 15, at 3:05 PM EST.

Final practice 
The final 50-minute practice session was held on Friday, April 15, at 5:35 PM EST.

Qualifying 
Qualifying was held on Saturday, April 16, at 4:30 PM EST. For qualifying, drivers will be split into four different 15 lap heat races, and their finishing position will determine the starting lineup. Austin Dillon, Ty Majeski, Joey Logano, and Chandler Smith would win the four races.

Race 1

Race 2

Race 3

Race 4

Starting lineup

Race results 
Stage 1 Laps: 40

Stage 2 Laps: 50

Stage 3 Laps: 60

Standings after the race 

Drivers' Championship standings

Note: Only the first 10 positions are included for the driver standings.

References 

2022 NASCAR Camping World Truck Series
NASCAR races at Bristol Motor Speedway
Pinty's Truck Race on Dirt
2022 in sports in Tennessee